The Atlantic City Pop Festival took place in 1969 on August 1, 2 and 3rd at the Atlantic City race track, two weeks before Woodstock Festival. It actually took place in Hamilton Township at the Atlantic City Race Course. There was heavy security at the festival, and the stage the acts performed on was created by Buckminster Fuller. A ticket for the entire 3-day weekend was $15.00 to see all of the performers listed. Attended by some 100,000+ people.

Performers
The festival featured the following performers:

Aum
Booker T. & the M.G.'s
Tim Buckley
Paul Butterfield Blues Band
The Byrds
Canned Heat
The Chambers Brothers 
Chicago (as the Chicago Transit Authority)
Joe Cocker
The Crazy World of Arthur Brown
Creedence Clearwater Revival
Crosby, Stills & Nash (billed, but did not perform)
Cass Elliot
Iron Butterfly
Jefferson Airplane
Dr. John the Night Tripper 
Janis Joplin
B.B. King
Lighthouse
Little Richard
Looking Glass  
Lothar and the Hand People
Mississippi Fred McDowell
Hugh Masekela
Buddy Miles
Joni Mitchell
The Mothers of Invention
Tracy Nelson & Mother Earth
Procol Harum
Buddy Rich
Biff Rose
Santana
Sir Douglas Quintet
Three Dog Night
The American Dream
Johnny Winter (billed, but did not perform)

Highlights
Lineup changes:
Crosby, Stills & Nash were originally on the lineup but ended up as a no-show, Nash was claimed to have had polyps on  his tonsils (but sang at Woodstock two weeks later). The Chambers Brothers substituted for the band at the last-minute. The Moody Blues were also scheduled but the band did not appear.
Blues guitarist Johnny Winter was present but unable to perform because of equipment trouble.
Janis Joplin and Mama Cass introduced Santana as their favorite band; this was their first appearance on the East Coast.

Memorable performances included:
Procol Harum performing "A Whiter Shade of Pale" and a series of songs from "A Salty Dog" while the wind whipped up the lake behind them.
Iron Butterfly's extended set of "In-A-Gadda-Da-Vida".
The Chambers Brothers followed Iron Butterfly with a memorable rendition of "Time Has Come Today" that had many in the crowd dancing on the huge speakers on the stage, some even with clothes on. They were the final Friday night act.
Dr. John the Night Tripper performing "Gris-Gris" and "Walk on Gilded Splinters".
Little Richard filled in for Johnny Winter playing a set on a white grand piano and rocked the track as he invited the audience to come up and dance on stage.
Janis Joplin and her Kozmic Blues Band electrified the audience with "Try", a cover of The Chantels "Maybe" and "As Good As You've Been To This World". She joined Little Richard on stage for a few tunes as well.
Joni Mitchell performed one song, complained that people were not listening, "I've just played the same verse twice and no one noticed", then left the stage. I was there and witnessed that. I did hear her say "I've just played the same verse twice and no one noticed", but she didn't leave the stage. I remember her restarting the song and continuing with her performance. Per a source, she was pelted with toilet paper steamers. One of them fell into the baby grand piano, she slammed down the cover and walked off stage… 
Joe Cocker performing "With A Little Help From My Friends" and "Feelin' Alright" while playing air guitar.
Mother Earth's lead singer Tracy Nelson wowed the crowd with her bluesy performance of "Mother Earth" and "Down So Low".
Aum opening the Friday show, ending the set as the guitarist leaped off the stage onto the racetrack below.

See also
List of historic rock festivals
List of music festivals in the United States

References

1969 in New Jersey
Hippie movement
Rock festivals in the United States
Folk festivals in the United States
Music festivals established in 1969
Pop music festivals in the United States
1969 music festivals